Jeremy Neale is an Australian songwriter and entertainer and lead singer of band Velociraptor.

History
In November 2017, Neale released his debut album, Getting the Team Back Together

At the 2018 Queensland Music Awards, Neale won Song of the Year for "Dancin' & Romancin'".

In December 2019, Neale hosted the National Live Music Awards of 2019

In February 2020, Neale released his second studio albu, We Were Trying To Make It Out which was written across two cities over two years.

Discography

Studio albums

Extended plays

Singles

As lead artist

Awards and nominations

J Awards
The J Awards are an annual series of Australian music awards that were established by the Australian Broadcasting Corporation's youth-focused radio station Triple J. They commenced in 2005.

|-
| J Awards of 2013
| Jeremy Neale
| Unearthed Artist of the Year
| 
|-

Queensland Music Awards
The Queensland Music Awards (previously known as Q Song Awards) are annual awards celebrating Queensland, Australia's brightest emerging artists and established legends. They commenced in 2006.
 
|-
| 2012
| "Winter Was the Time"
| Rock Song of the Year
| 
|-
| 2013
| "In Strange Times"
| The Courier-Mail People's Choice Award Most Popular Male
| 
|-
|rowspan="2"| 2018
|rowspan="2"| "Dancin' & Romancin'" 
| Song of the Year
| 
|-
| Rock Song of the Year
| 
|-

References

Australian male singers
Living people
Year of birth missing (living people)